Luca yanayacensis is a moth of the family Notodontidae first described by James S. Miller in 2011. It is found in north-eastern Ecuador.

The length of the forewings is 18–22 mm. The ground colour of the forewings is a mottled mixture of whitish green, lime green and dark moss green scales. The ground colour of the hindwings is dirty grey brown.

Etymology
The species name refers to the type locality for this species, the Yanayacu Biological Station in Napo, Ecuador.

References

Moths described in 2011
Notodontidae